Janusz Adam Krężelok (born 18 December 1974 in Istebna) is a Polish cross-country skier who has competed since 1994. His best individual finish at the FIS Nordic World Ski Championships was a seventh in the individual sprint in 2005 while his best overall finish was fifth in the team sprint (with Maciej Kreczmer) event in 2007.

Krężelok's best individual finish at the Winter Olympics was ninth in the sprint event at Salt Lake City in 2002.

He has a total of nine individual career victories at various levels up to 15 km since 1999.

References
 

1974 births
Cross-country skiers at the 1998 Winter Olympics
Cross-country skiers at the 2002 Winter Olympics
Cross-country skiers at the 2006 Winter Olympics
Cross-country skiers at the 2010 Winter Olympics
Living people
Polish male cross-country skiers
Olympic cross-country skiers of Poland
People from Cieszyn Silesia
People from Cieszyn County
Sportspeople from Silesian Voivodeship